Nanoq Media Lokal is a Greenlandic television channel.  The local TV channel features news programs, lectures, music and other local events.

The channel was launched in 2002.

References

External links
 (in Greenlandic and Danish)

Television channels and stations established in 2002
2002 establishments in Greenland